West Virginia Route 635 is a north–south state highway located in McDowell County, West Virginia. The southern terminus is at the Virginia state line south of Jolo, where the road continues south as State Route 635, a secondary state highway. The northern terminus of the route is at West Virginia Route 83 in Jolo.

Major intersections

References

635
Transportation in McDowell County, West Virginia